The FIS Alpine World Ski Championships 2009 were the 40th FIS Alpine World Ski Championships, held 2–15 February in France at Val-d'Isère, Savoie.

The International Ski Federation (FIS) awarded the championships to Val-d'Isère on 2 June 2004, in Miami, Florida.  The other two finalists were Vail/Beaver Creek, USA, and Schladming, Austria, which was later selected to host the 2013 championships. Vail/Beaver Creek gained the 2015 championships.

These were the first world championships at Val-d'Isère, although the area hosted four of the five men's events at the 1992 Winter Olympics in Albertville (the slalom was held at Les Menuires).  Val-d'Isère is a regular stop on the World Cup circuit, usually by the men in early to mid-December.

These were the fourth world championships held in France.  Chamonix hosted in 1937 and 1962, and Chamrousse hosted the alpine events for 1968 Winter Olympics (from 1948 through 1980, the Winter Olympics were also the world championships).

Venues
 The men's events were held at Bellevarde, as were the women's giant slalom and slalom. The other three women's events were conducted at Rhône-Alpes.

Medal winners

Men's events

Women's events

Team event

Medal table

References

External links

 FIS-ski.com – 2009 World Championships

 
A
FIS World Championships
2009
International sports competitions hosted by France
Sport in Savoie
Alpine skiing competitions in France
FIS Alpine World Ski Championships